TV3 is a Danish pay television channel owned by Viaplay Group. It was separated from the earlier Pan-Scandinavian version in 1990.

Unlike its main rivals, DR and TV 2, the channel does not broadcast from Denmark but from the United Kingdom. This excludes the channel from the rules in Denmark that apply to advertising, meaning TV3 interrupts programming with commercial breaks.

The channel has aired many American and British series.

References

External links
 Official site

Television stations in Denmark
TV3 Denmark
Television channels and stations established in 1990
Television channel articles with incorrect naming style
1990 establishments in Denmark